Charles Flower may refer to:

 Charles Edward Flower (1830–1892), English brewer
 Charles E. Flower (1871–1951; Charles Edwin Flower), English painter, draughtsman and illustrator
 Sir Charles Flower, 1st Baronet (c. 1763–1834), Mayor of London

See also 
 Charles Flowers (disambiguation)
 Flower (surname)